Landau, Luckman, and Lake or LLL is a fictional holding company appearing in American comic books published by Marvel Comics, particularly in the pages of the Wolverine, Uncanny X-Men and Deadpool comic books.  Created by writer Chris Claremont, the company was first mentioned in Wolverine #5 (March 1989).

Claremont based the name of the organization on the original owners of the Forbidden Planet comic store: Nick Landau, Mike Luckman and Mike Lake.

Overview

Although Landau, Luckman, and Lake is an intergalactic holding company which oversees and manages a number of subsidiary companies such as a law firm of the same name, it is in reality a front organization for a private espionage contractor which, in turn, is controlled by a cabal conspiring to "immanentize the eschaton". Some of these companies provide cover, plausible occupations and means of income, for its covert agents. LLL is made up of a diverse mixture of personnel, drawn from intelligence or fringe scientific backgrounds. It possesses a precognitive department and interdimensional teleportation technology which makes its foresight and reach beyond imagination.

As a vast, shadow government-like organization with storehouses of dreadful secrets, staff being unknowingly used to further an agenda, and an interest in controlling the path humanity will take into an ominous future, the extent of Landau, Luckman, and Lake's influence behind the scenes of the major events in the Marvel Universe has yet to be revealed.

Employee roster

Current roster

Landau, Luckman, and Lake (first names all unknown). Senior partners at LLL.

Notable former employees
Captain America. Agent 
Chang - Agent. Killed in Wolverine #5.
Deadpool -  Agent
Emmett - Office boy, only survivor of an attack by Chimera.
Emmett - Agent. Helped Wolverine and Venom fight Chimera and Dirtnap.
Gerry - Gerry Lequarre, senior partner, the "Fourth L" of LLL
Zoe Culloden - Agent, Expediter and former Overboss
Overboss Dixon -  Head of the Mithras Directive
Noah DuBois - Telepathic agent
Mikitan - Agent
Montgomery - Montgomery Burns, precognitive agent.
Wolverine -  Agent
Rose Wu -  Also known as Rose Carling. Scientist and engineer specializing in interdimensional teleportation technology. Minor shapeshifting abilities. Murdered by enemies of Wolverine.

Notes

References

Characters created by Chris Claremont